Apatopygus is a genus of echinoderms belonging to the family Apatopygidae.

The species of this genus are found in Australia and New Zealand.

Species:

Apatopygus garciasanzi 
Apatopygus gaudensis 
Apatopygus mannumensis 
Apatopygus occidentalis 
Apatopygus recens 
Apatopygus vincentinus

References

Apatopygidae
Echinoidea genera
Echinoderms of Oceania